The Sunnagyn Range, also known as Aldan-Uchur, is a range of mountains in North-eastern Russia. Administratively the range is part of the Sakha Republic, Russian Federation.

Geography 
The Sunnagyn is the highest subrange of the Aldan Highlands of the South Siberian System. It rises at the northeastern edge of the highlands, south of the right bank of the Aldan River, between the valley of its tributary Timpton to the west, and the Uchur to the east. The Gynym, a tributary of the Uchur, marks the southern border of the range.

Flora
The mountain slopes and the river valleys of the Sunnagyn Range are covered with larch forests. Thickets of dwarf cedar grow at higher altitudes and mountain tundra above the treeline.

See also
List of mountains and hills of Russia
Sunnaginia

References

External links
Rare birds of the Aldan highlands (South Yakutia)

Mountain ranges of the Sakha Republic
Aldan Highlands
South Siberian Mountains
ceb:Aldano-Uchurskiy Khrebet
pl:Sunnagyn
ru:Суннагын
sah:Алдан - Учур